Rocky Votolato is the 1999 debut release from Seattle singer-songwriter Rocky Votolato. Originally released in 1999, these songs were recorded in a basement with two microphones over a 4-hour period. Although written between 1996 and 1997, it wasn't until 2008 that the album became accessible, when it was re-released by Second Nature.

Track listing
 "I'd Be Fine" – 1:29
 "Treepeople" – 2:24
 "Intro To ACGF" – 1:49
 "Cut Me in Two" – 2:18
 "Victims" – 3:25
 "Blood in Your Eyes" – 3:54
 "A Painting of a Song" – 2:47
 "The Bed Is Warm" – 3:37
 "People To Impress" – 3:02
 "Work Hard" – 1:36
 "Coast Lines To Follow" – 2:36
 "I Remember Music" – 4:42

External links
 Official Website
 Second Nature Recordings

1999 debut albums
Rocky Votolato albums